Florian Heinemann (born January 15, 1976 in Bergisch Gladbach) is a German entrepreneur, venture capitalist and angel investor.

In 1999 Heinemann received a degree in business administration from the WHU - Otto Beisheim School of Management Koblenz. Heinemann was a co-founder and managing director of JustBooks (later AbeBooks, sold to Amazon). After that he was head of online marketing at Jamba! and the Online Dating Portal iLove. In 2006 he co-founded the online marketplace Antibodies Online. From 2007 to 2012 he was a managing director at Rocket Internet. While at Rocket Internet he was mainly involved in the development of Zalando, Global Fashion Group and eDarling/Affinitas. Florian Heinemann is a general partner of the early stage investor Project A Ventures in Berlin, where he is responsible for the areas marketing, CRM and business intelligence. He is a regular speaker and keynote speaker at conferences on entrepreneurship, venture capital, digital marketing and technology. Heinemann has published articles in international scientific journals.

Bibliography 
Published in Germany:

 Organisation von Projekten zur Neuproduktentwicklung. Gabler Edition Wissenschaft, Hamburg 2014. .
 Unternehmertum. Kochhammer Verlag, Stuttgart 2014. .
 Erfolgreiche Unternehmerteams. Springer Gabler, Wiesbaden 2009. .

Guest contributions 
Published in Germany:

 Das E-Commerce Buch: Marktanalysen – Geschäftsmodelle – Strategien, Deutscher Fachverlag, 2017. .
 Online Mittelstand in Deutschland, Band 4, CreateSpace Independent Publishing, 2015. .
 Entrepreneurship (ZfB Special Issue), Gabler Verlag, 2006. .
 Online-Kooperationen: Erfolg im E-Business durch strategische Partnerschaften, Gabler Verlag, 2003. .
 Innovation – Technik – Zukunft, Springer Fachmedien Wiesbaden, 2002. .
 Die eCommerce-Gewinner. Wie Unternehmen im Web profitabel wurden., Frankfurter Allgemeine Buch, 2002. .
 Silicon Valley, Made in Germany. Was Sie von erfolgreichen Unternehmen der New Economy lernen können., Vieweg Publishing Company, 2000. .

Recognition 

 2012 “Top 40 under 40” (printed edition Capital Deutschland Magazine)
 1996–1999 scholarship holder of the German Academic Scholarship Foundation

References

External links 
 Private homepage
 Profile at Project A Ventures

1976 births
Living people
German company founders